Events from the year 1340 in Ireland.

Incumbent
Lord: Edward III

Events 
March – Edmond Albanach de Burgh is granted a royal pardon for the murder of his cousin in 1338 and returns from exile in the western isles of Connacht.
Robert de Askeby appointed Lord Chancellor of Ireland

Deaths
 Tomás Mág Samhradháin

References

 
1340s in Ireland
Ireland
Years of the 14th century in Ireland